Corn Holm is a small tidal island in Orkney, near Copinsay to the west, off the north-eastern coast of Scotland. There was once a small chapel there, and it is covered in birdlife.

Geography and geology 
Corn Holm is made up of red sandstone. At low tide it is connected to Black Holm and Ward Holm, and is connected to Copinsay by a stretch called "Isle Rough". The sections north and south of Isle Rough are known as North and South Bay.

References 

Islands of the Orkney Islands
Tidal islands of Scotland